Gunther Schepens (born 4 May 1973) is a retired Belgian footballer. At this moment, he is the technical coördinator of the youth teams of the football team K.A.A. Gent. He is also co-responsible for the scouting of new players.

Career 
Schepens began his career 1981 in the youth of the local team Eendracht Massemen. 1985 the Young central player was transferred to K.A.A. Gent, where he had to wait until 1991 before he could make his debut in the first team. In his second year in the team of the "Buffalos" he started to play regularly. A year later he was transferred during winter to Standard Liège.

In 1994–95, he almost became champion with Standard Liège. The team ended on the second spot, behind RSC Anderlecht. Schepens was in that period one of the key players of Standard, together with Marc Wilmots, Gilbert Bodart, Régis Genaux, Philippe Léonard and Michaël Goossens. 1997 he left the team and went during summer to the German team Karlsruher SC. In his first season, he became a key player in the team, but one year later he didn't get many chances anymore in the team. This was why, 1999 he decided to return to Belgium.

Over there, he started to work in the team where it all began for him, KAA Gent. In his second period in Gent, the team grew to its top-level as a real subtop-team. The team got some strong players, such as keeper and team icon Frédéric Herpoel and striker Alexandros Kaklamanos. 2003 Schepens changed Gent for the Austrian team SW Bregenz.

He played two more years in Bregenz, after which he stopped definitively in the highest series due to a knee injury. Three years after his last game he started to play again in the team of Eendracht Massemen. He also plays in the futsal team De Woody's, of which the trainer is the Belgian writer and columnist Herman Brusselmans. Just like Brusselmans, Schepens sometimes is the analyst in the football program Studio 1 op zondag on the public broadcast company.
In the summer of 2010, he analysed a big deal of the games of the World Championship football in South Africa on the Belgian television channel Canvas. He is well-known on the Flemish television because of this humoristic remarks and enlarged football knowledge.
Schepens was a thirteen-time international for the Belgium national team Rode Duivels.

Career statistics

International goals

Honours
 13 selections and 3 goals in the national team of Belgium as from 1995 to 1997
 vice-champion of Belgium in 1995 with Standard Liège

References

External links
 Profile at Standard de Liège 
 

1973 births
Living people
Belgian footballers
Belgium international footballers
Belgian expatriate footballers
Standard Liège players
Karlsruher SC players
K.A.A. Gent players
SW Bregenz players
Belgian Pro League players
Bundesliga players
Austrian Football Bundesliga players
Expatriate footballers in Germany
Expatriate footballers in Austria
Footballers from Ghent
Association football midfielders